Dickweiler is a village in the commune of Rosport, in eastern Luxembourg.  , the village has a population of 107.  

Rosport
Villages in Luxembourg